Robinsons is a village in the Bay St. George area of the Canadian province of Newfoundland and Labrador. "Robinson's Head" has been on maps since about 1798. The headland and community were named after John Robinson from Ireland who lived in a cave in Robinson's Head. "Robinson's Station" about two miles from the original village came into being after the railway was constructed in the late 1890s and people, mainly those working at railway maintenance, settled in the area where the local road intersected the railway. The name "Robinson's Station" became simply "Robinson's" on October 1, 1960. Robinson's had a population of 299 in 1956. "Modern" Robinsons consists of the original Robinson's Head settlement (Robinsons), Robinsons Station (the rail-line settlement), and Robinsons Junction (small cluster of buildings at or near a road junction).  For census purposes, all three are counted under the "Robinsons" name. The community is located along Route 404.

See also
List of communities in Newfoundland and Labrador

Populated coastal places in Canada
Populated places in Newfoundland and Labrador